Birger of Sweden may refer to:

 Birger, King of Sweden also called Birger Magnusson (c. 1280–1321), King of Sweden 1290–1318
 Birger Jarl also called Birger Magnusson (c. 1200 – 1266), Jarl of Sweden and statesman